Liga Deportiva Universitaria de Quito's 2023 season is the club's 93rd year of existence, the 70th year in professional football, and the 62nd in the top level of professional football in Ecuador.

Club

Personnel
President: Isaac Álvarez
President of the Executive Commission: Esteban Paz
Sporting manager: Santiago Jácome

Coaching staff
Manager: Luis Zubeldía
Assistant manager: Maximiliano Cuberas, Carlos Gruezo
Physical trainer: Lucas Vivas
Goalkeeper trainer: Luis Preti

Kits
Supplier: Puma
Sponsor(s): Banco Pichincha, Mazda, Discover, Ecuabet, Salud SA

Squad information

Note: Caps and goals are of the national league and are current as of the beginning of the season.

Winter transfers

Competitions

Pre-season friendlies

LigaPro

The 2023 season is Liga's 62nd season in the Serie A and their 22nd consecutive.

First stage

Results summary

Results by round

Second stage

Results summary

Results by round

CONMEBOL Sudamericana

L.D.U. Quito qualified to the 2023 CONMEBOL Sudamericana—their 14th participation in the continental tournament—as 4th place in the 2022 LigaPro. They will enter the competition in the First Stage.

CONMEBOL Sudamericana squad

Source:

First stage

Copa Ecuador

Player statistics

Note: Players in italics left the club mid-season.

Team statistics

References

External links
  

2023
2023 in Ecuadorian football